Black Horse Inn, also known as Sampson & the Lion, is a historic inn and tavern located in Flourtown in Springfield Township, Montgomery County, Pennsylvania. The original section was built in 1744 and is a -story stuccoed stone structure with a one-story, stone kitchen addition in the rear. The original section measures 16 feet by 18 feet, and the kitchen addition 15 feet by 15 feet. 

In 1833, a three-story addition was made to the north and between 1880 and 1908, three one-story additions were made to the rear.  Also in 1833, a one-story porch was added to the front, west, and south sides. The building is in the Federal style.

It was listed on the National Register of Historic Places in 2005.

References 

Hotel buildings on the National Register of Historic Places in Pennsylvania
Federal architecture in Pennsylvania
Hotel buildings completed in 1744
Buildings and structures in Montgomery County, Pennsylvania
National Register of Historic Places in Montgomery County, Pennsylvania
1744 establishments in the Thirteen Colonies